The Sixth Seimas of Lithuania was the first parliament (Seimas) elected in Lithuania after it restored independence on 11 March 1990. Elections took place on 25 October 1992, with the second round on 15 November. In a surprisingly decisive outcome, the elections were won by Democratic Labour Party of Lithuania (LDDP), with 73 seats. The result reflected widespread dissatisfaction with the economic situation and the policies of the ruling Sąjūdis political movement in the preceding Supreme Council of Lithuania.

The Sixth Seimas commenced its work on 25 November 1992 and served a four-year term, with the last session on 19 November 1996. Algirdas Brazauskas, the leader of LDDP, became the Speaker of the Seimas, before assuming the role of the President of Lithuania. He was succeeded as the Speaker by his party colleague Česlovas Juršėnas, who served for the rest of the term.

Three LDDP-led governments changed during the term of the Sixth Seimas. The government of Bronislovas Lubys, an independent business manager, served for a short period before the presidential election in 1993. The government of Adolfas Šleževičius was in power for most of the term, but the Prime Minister was forced out after a financial scandal in December 1995. Laurynas Stankevičius led the government for the rest of the term.

The Sixth Seimas adopted a number of laws, mostly related to agricultural reform, implementation of the Constitution of Lithuania and the introduction of Litas as the national currency. Supervision of financial markets was enhanced after a number of early financial institutions collapsed and other financial scandals came to light in 1994. On the other hand, the slow pace of market reforms, failure to restore the ownership of confiscated private property and weak efforts to fight corruption were criticized by the opposition. The chaotic process of privatization of public assets also came under criticism for allowing well-connected individuals and groups to take control of state enterprises.

Elections

In the elections in 1992, 70 members of the parliament were elected on proportional party lists and 71 in single member constituencies. Elections took place on 25 October 1992. In those constituencies where no candidate won outright on 25 October, a run-off was held on 15 November.

The main challenger to the ruling Sąjūdis nationalist movement, which had controlled the Supreme Council since February 1990 and spearheaded the move to independence, was the Democratic Labour Party of Lithuania (LDDP). In the run-up to the elections, Sąjūdis portrayed the opposing political groups as communist and reactionary, opposed to independence and democracy. The LDDP declared their commitment to maintaining foreign policy goals, including joining Council of Europe and agreements with other international organizations, while also promising friendlier relations and better trade with Russia.

The result was a victory for the LDDP, which won 73 seats. Analysts attributed the surprisingly decisive victory to support from farmers and the Russian and Polish minorities, as well as widespread dissatisfaction with the economic situation and the policies of the ruling Sąjūdis political movement, which only managed to win 30 seats.

Activities

The newly elected Sixth Seimas first gathered on 25 November 1992. In what was to become a procedural tradition, the first session was presided over by the oldest member of the parliament – Juozas Bulavas. As the new parliament lacked clear procedures governing its work (the Statute of Seimas was only adopted on 26 February 1994), it was decided to follow the regulations of the preceding Supreme Council of Lithuania.

Algirdas Brazauskas was elected as the first Speaker of the Sixth Seimas, supported by 81 of the parliament members. Brazauskas only acted in this capacity for less than a day – as soon as Seimas adopted the necessary legal framework, he assumed the position of acting President of Lithuania, in accordance with the constitution. His deputy, Česlovas Juršėnas became the acting Speaker of the Parliament. After the presidential election early the following year, Brazauskas became the first post-independence President of Lithuania, resigned from the Seimas and Juršėnas was elected as the Speaker for the remainder of the term.

Algirdas Brazauskas proposed Bronislovas Lubys, the managing director of “Azotas” (later Achema), as the Prime Minister of the fifth government. His candidacy was approved by the parliament with 87 votes in favor. It was understood that the government was to be short-lived, as it would have to return its mandate after the presidential elections early in 1993. The government included only three members of LDDP, while nine ministers retained their positions from the previous Sąjūdis-led government. In late 1992 and early 1993 the Seimas adopted the laws implementing the position of the President of Lithuania and governing the elections.

After the presidential elections, Brazauskas put forward economist and businessman Adolfas Šleževičius as the Prime Minister of the sixth government. His candidacy was approved by the Seimas and the government started their work on 16 March 1993, with the stated priorities of creating the foundations for competitive market economy and improving social safety net.

In order to secure monetary stability and control the inflation, Litas was introduced as the national currency of Lithuania, with the circulation starting on 25 June 1993. In 1994, it was pegged to the US Dollar at the rate of 4:1. The introduction of the currency did not soften the growing tensions between the Government, the Seimas and the Bank of Lithuania, which was criticized for its commercial activities and poor supervision of commercial banks. On 10 March 1993, the parliament accepted the resignation of bank's chairman, Vilius Baldišius, replacing him with Romualdas Visokavičius two weeks later. After the Commission for Investigating Financial Crimes, established by the Seimas, uncovered irregularities and illegal transactions in the bank, the Seimas expressed no-confidence in Visokavičius on 19 October 1993, forcing him out and replacing him with Kazimieras Ratkevičius.

Failure to supervise the financial sector, at that point dominated by weak banks and outright financial pyramids that wiped out the savings of a substantial part of the population, was cited by the opposition as one of the reasons for its proposal to express no-confidence in the Government in June 1994, the first such proposal in post-independence Lithuania. Nevertheless, the government survived this and another interpellation on 31 October 1995. The situation changed after the collapse of two commercial banks in December 1995. It emerged that Prime Minister Šleževičius had withdrawn his savings from one of the two banks just days before its collapse. After refusing to resign, he was forced out by the Seimas in a secret-ballot vote on 19 December 1995, with 94 members supporting his ousting. Laurynas Stankevičius, a minister in the Šleževičius cabinet, was approved by the Seimas on 15 February 1996 as the Prime Minister of the seventh government and served until the end of the term of the Seimas. 
    
Almost half of all the laws adopted during the period of the Sixth Seimas were related to agricultural reform, implementation of the Constitution of Lithuania and the introduction of Litas as the national currency. Among other important decisions, the Seimas adopted a structural reform of the judiciary and set up the Constitutional Court. The taxation system was reformed, partly in response to budget deficits that the Sixth Seimas never managed to close, and the Value Added Tax introduced. Dual-layered local government was introduced, with municipal and county administrations sharing the responsibility. Municipal administrations took over functions previously held by powiats, while county administrations took over functions previously held by the central government.

On the other hand, the opposition criticized the successive governments and the ruling majority for the slow pace of market reforms, failure to restore the ownership of confiscated private property and weak efforts to fight corruption.

The privatization program, which had been started already in 1990, was initially criticized by the newly elected parliamentary majority, but soon continued. In a chaotic process, the laws governing privatization were reviewed and changed constantly, but still had loopholes in them that allowed well-connected individuals and financial groups to assume control of government property at fire-sale prices. The second stage of privatization started in July 1995 with Seimas adopting the new Law on Privatization of Government and Municipal Property. The new law attempted to eliminate many of the weaknesses in the privatization process – assets could now be sold only for cash, discounts for employees were eliminated and equal participation rights were granted to local and foreign investors. However, the new law did not meet the expectations and the privatization process remained inefficient and prone to corruption.

The two largest powers in the Sixth Seimas had vastly different views on how the land reform should take place. Sąjūdis (and Homeland Union that emerged from it) focused on returning the agricultural land to those that had lost it in the waves of Soviet collectivization and implemented it as a policy when in power before 1992. LDDP, on the other hand, prioritized maintaining the existing levels of production, which meant ensuring that the land stays in the hands of those who would work it most efficiently. Once in power, LDDP introduced changes to the Law on Land Reform, slowing down the process of restitution and limiting its scope.

In foreign policy, the Sixth Seimas maintained a pro-European stance, despite Sąjūdis warning the electorate that the success of LDDP would inevitably orient Lithuania towards Russia. Instead, the LDDP-led Sixth Seimas proclaimed the continuity of the previous foreign policy. The last of Russian military forces left Lithuania in 1993. Lithuania soon joined the Council of Europe, while maintaining its long-term goals of joining NATO and European Union. Application to NATO for possible membership has been sent in 1994, application to EU has been sent one year later

Composition

Leadership

The board of the Seimas consisted of the Speaker of the Seimas, his deputies and the chancellor of the Seimas. The functions assigned to these positions and the procedures for their appointment evolved during the term.

Parliamentary groups

On the second day of the term, 26 November 1992, the following parliamentary groups were registered: Christian Democrats, Sąjūdis, Citizen Charter, Democratic Labour Party of Lithuania, Social Democrats of Lithuania. While politically aligned, Christian Democrats, Sąjūdis and Citizen Charter formed three separate political groups in the Seimas in order to secure more seats in parliamentary committees. Nevertheless, the alignment fractured, as the Political Prisoners and Deportees and the Democratic Party left the political group of Christian Democrats, while only 23 of the 30 members of Sąjūdis and Citizen Charter joined the parliamentary group of Homeland Union-Lithuanian Conservatives.

The opposition to the government in the Sixth Seimas was twofold: Homeland Union-Lithuanian Conservatives led the radical opposition, relentlessly criticizing the government, while the Social Democrats and the Centre Union formed the moderate opposition. During the term there were several cases of departures or expulsions from both the ruling political group of the Democratic Labour Party and the opposition political groups. However, due to the vast gulf between the ruling and opposition parties, there were few defections across ideological borders.

The following parliamentary groups were active at the end of the term.

Committees
Parliamentary committees are formed to consider draft legislation and can explore and clarify other issues in their area of competence. Eleven committees were active during the Sixth Seimas.

Commissions
Permanent of temporary parliamentary commissions are formed to work on a particular question or issue assigned to them by the Seimas.

Permanent commission active during the term of the Sixth Seimas were Ethics, Administration and Petition commissions. Of particular interest in the Sixth Seimas was the Commission for Investigating Financial Crimes, established by the Seimas in 1993 and headed by parliament member Virgilijus Vladislovas Bulovas (later - by Vytautas Juškus). The commission worked to identify loopholes in existing laws that allowed officials and well-connected individuals to take possession of government property and investigated corruption by government officials. The commission also dealt with numerous financial scandals that took place during the term, particularly the failure of several commercial banks at the end of 1995.

Temporary commissions were created to investigate ad-hoc questions. During the term of the Sixth Seimas these questions included the activities of commercial banks, the activities of the House of Signatories, and the decisions of the previous government of Gediminas Vagnorius.

Members
A total of 147 members served on the Sixth Seimas, including 137 men and 10 women. The vast majority of Seimas members were ethnic Lithuanians. Russian and Polish ethnic minorities, each constituting around 6% of the population in Lithuania, were represented by 3 and 6 members, respectively.

References

Legal history of Lithuania
1990s in Lithuania
06